The Circuit de Barcelona-Catalunya is a  motorsport race track in Montmeló, Barcelona, Catalonia, Spain. With long straights and a variety of corners, the Circuit de Barcelona-Catalunya is seen as an all-rounder circuit. The track has stands with a capacity of 140,700. The circuit has FIA Grade 1 license.

Until 2013 the track was known only as the Circuit de Catalunya, before a sponsorship deal with Barcelona City Council added Barcelona to the track's title.

History

The Circuit de Barcelona-Catalunya was built in 1991 and began hosting the Spanish Grand Prix that same year. Construction also coincided with the Olympic Games scheduled to take place in Barcelona the next year, where the circuit acted as the start and finish line for the road team time trial cycling event. The Circuit de Barcelona-Catalunya should not be confused with the Montjuïc circuit, which hosted the Spanish Grand Prix four times between 1969 and 1975 and, unlike the Circuit de Barcelona-Catalunya, is actually located within the city of Barcelona.

Because so much testing is done at this circuit, Formula One drivers and mechanics are extremely familiar with it. This has led to criticism that drivers and mechanics are too familiar with Catalunya, reducing the amount of on-track action.

When first used, overtaking was frequent as cars could follow closely through the last two corners and slipstream down the long straight. As aerodynamic balance became more critical, this overtaking method drastically decreased as the cars were unable to follow each other through the fast final corner due to turbulence created by the leading car. The 2007 season saw the first of the two final sweepers replaced with a slow chicane to reduce speeds through the final corner, where serious accidents could occur, and in an effort to improve overtaking. However, it has been criticised for failing to achieve the latter aim and for causing congestion during qualifying sessions. The 2022 race was, until now, the last Formula One race to use the chicane, with the original configuration restored ahead of the 2023 race.

The Circuit de Barcelona-Catalunya has hosted a motorcycle Grand Prix since 1992, originally the European motorcycle Grand Prix from 1992 and later the Catalan motorcycle Grand Prix since 1996. There are at least five points on the track (turns 1, 2, 4, 10, 14) where riders are known to overtake.  As in Formula 1, Turn 1 is arguably the most popular place for overtaking. The circuit is not known to produce copious amounts of overtaking, despite the long straights. Originally, the Formula 1 circuit changes were not instituted for MotoGP; however, after a fatal crash in the 2016 MotoGP round involving a Moto2 rider, Luis Salom, the Formula 1 layout was implemented to slow down riders for safety purposes.  The FIM made a further change to the chicane for 2017 by moving up the chicane to prevent riders from cutting the pit lane entrance, but that was abandoned because the motorcycle chicane had a surface change that created more safety issues with the transition.  Further changes were made to the circuit in December 2017 as grandstands were removed to add additional runoff that allowed the FIM to eliminate that chicane (although the Turn 10 hairpin was kept).

The track was resurfaced in 2018 as a result of calls by MotoGP riders to improve the amount of grip on the surface. Previously the track had been resurfaced in 2004.

The circuit hosted many other international racing series, including the FIA Sportscar Championship (1999–2002), European Touring Car Championship (2003), FIA GT Championship (2003), Deutsche Tourenwagen Masters (2006–2009), European Le Mans Series (2008–2009, 2019, 2021–present), and World Series Formula V8 3.5 (2002–2004, 2006–2013, 2016), GT World Challenge Europe Endurance Cup (2017–present), 24h de Barcelona Trofeu Fermí Vélez, and FIA World Rallycross Championship (2015-present).

Since 2016, the racetrack hosts the 24h BiCircuit Festival, an ultra-distance cycling event featuring 24-hour, 12-hour and 6-hour races for soloists and relay teams up to 8 riders.

For the 2020 Formula One season Liberty Media expected the calendar would consist of twenty-one Grands Prix and that any new races would come at the expense of existing events, in particular the Dutch Grand Prix in Zandvoort replacing the Spanish Grand Prix on Circuit de Barcelona, but later negotiated an agreement with the teams to allow up to twenty-two Grands Prix, salvaging the Spanish Grand Prix. Before 2021 season, the circuit's F1 deal was extended for one more year. However in November 2021, the circuit's F1 deal was extended to 2026.

Barcelona has the 3-star FIA Environmental Accreditation and the ISO 14001 certification. In a 2021 report, it was ranked the second most sustainable racetrack in the world, together with Circuit Paul Ricard and behind Mugello Circuit.

Racing history
The circuit has been the site of some memorable moments. In 1991, Ayrton Senna and Nigel Mansell went down the entire front straight side by side while dueling for second place, with Mansell eventually taking the position and ultimately the race itself. In 1994, Michael Schumacher managed to finish in second place despite driving over half the race with only fifth gear.  In 1996, Schumacher took his first win as a Ferrari driver, after a dominant performance during a torrential rainstorm. In 2001, Mika Häkkinen suffered a clutch failure while leading the race on the last lap, handing the win to Schumacher. At the 2006 event, Fernando Alonso became the first Spanish Formula One driver to win at his home country's track.

In 2008, Heikki Kovalainen left the track at  after a wheel rim failure at turn 9. He managed to decelerate to  when he hit the tyre barrier. He was temporarily unconscious and suffered a minor concussion, but a few minutes later, spectators were relieved when he gave a thumbs up.

The circuit has been the scene of two debut wins in Formula One. Pastor Maldonado took his first and only Grand Prix victory and podium here in 2012, and in 2016 Max Verstappen won his first Grand Prix. As a result, he became the youngest driver to ever win an F1 Grand Prix race.

At the 2009 motorcycle Grand Prix, teammates Valentino Rossi and Jorge Lorenzo fought all race long for first place, culminating in an overtake on the final corner by Rossi. Riders and pundits described the race as "historic" and "genius".

On 3 June 2016, during Moto2 Free Practice for the 2016 Catalan motorcycle Grand Prix, Luis Salom crashed in turn 12, resulting in the session being red-flagged. After being transferred to the local Hospital General de Catalunya, Salom died of the injuries sustained in the crash. Upon hearing this, FIM decided to change the current layout of the track to the same layout as the one used in Formula One. After off-season discussions, the FIM announced that the track layout would be slightly modified in that the chicane would be moved up a few metres.

Layout

The track is demanding of a car's aerodynamic qualities. The wind direction at the circuit can change drastically during the day, a significant factor given the importance of aerodynamics to modern Formula One cars. It is then difficult to find a good setup since cars can have massive aerodynamic drag and understeer on one part of the circuit in the morning, but suffer oversteer at the same part of the circuit in the afternoon. A given tyre compound can work well when tested, but not so well a couple of months later. These changeable conditions can make for unexpected performances from some teams during the race. The changeable wind conditions have also caused accidents at the circuit, with Fernando Alonso's testing accident in 2015 partly blamed on the severity of the wind.

Through 2015, the MotoGP layout used the 1995–2003 version of the Grand Prix circuit. This was originally the same layout as Formula One, but in 2004 a new, slower La Caixa turn was built;  the motorcycles continued to use the old version, and they also ignored the shorter Europcar turn and RACC chicane. The F1 layout was implemented for MotoGP originally in 2016 following the fatal accident of Luis Salom in Europcar corner on 3 June 2016. Race control switched to the F1 circuit for qualifying and the race on 5 June 2016. On 15 December 2016, the FIM announced the change was permanent by announcing plans for a chicane ahead of the current car chicane. However, during the 2017 race, the new chicane was deemed dangerous by riders because of a surface change, and the car chicane was used during that event. After changes to the track in the off-season including removing grandstands in Turn 12, creating additional runoff and a complete repaving of the circuit, the F1 layout from 2004 to 2006, including the new La Caixa hairpin instead of the long sweeper, was used, eliminating the chicane.

For 2021, the La Caixa hairpin was remodelled again, slower than the original one but faster than the F1 one. The alterations were done to improve safety for the drivers.

The World RX of Spain uses parts of the track near turns 11–15, with two additional gravel sections.
From the 2023 Spanish Grand Prix, Formula One will use the layout used by MotoGP since 2021 removing the chicane in the last sector of the lap that Formula One had used every year since it was introduced in 2007 reverting the final corners for Formula One cars to a sweeping fast configuration that Formula One last used in 2006.

A lap in a Formula One car

The inside and outside are equally difficult for overtaking; drivers who can hold the line around the outside of turn one, can get the inside line for turn two. The corners themselves make up a medium-speed chicane – drivers brake rather late for turn one (Elf) and shift down to gear two, and turn two is almost full throttle as they try to gain as much exit speed as possible. Turn 3 (Renault) is a long, flat-out (in most cars) right-hander that has a g-force of about four, and it leads to a short straight before turn 4, the Repsol curve. Another right-hander, turn four is similar to Monza's Curva Parabolica – drivers brake and take an early apex (in third gear), carrying great speed out of the exit. Turn 5 (Seat) comes immediately after and is a slow left-hander taken in second gear which drops rapidly downhill towards the left kink of turn 6 which is ignored by F1 cars. Turns 7 and 8 make up a medium-speed, uphill, left-right chicane. Drivers brake and shift down to gear three, and must not run too wide as turn eight has a large kerb on its apex which could potentially damage cars' suspensions. Turn 9, Campsa Corner, is a very fast, sixth-gear right-hander which is made incredibly difficult by being completely blind (drivers cannot see the apex on approach). It is initially quite steep uphill but the exit is then downhill, so it is quite easy to run wide onto the astroturf. The long back straight leads into turn 10 (La Caixa), a third-gear, left-hand corner, then turns 11 and 12, a left kink before a long, slow, third-gear right. Turn 13 and 14, a very fast, sixth-gear double right-hander which takes cars across the start/finish line.

Layout history

Events

 Current
 February: Porsche Sprint Challenge Southern Europe
 March: Formula Winter Series, GT Winter Series
 April: European Le Mans Series 4 Hours of Barcelona, Le Mans Cup, Porsche Carrera Cup France, Ligier European Series
 May: Superbike World Championship, Supersport World Championship, Supersport 300 World Championship, Formula Regional European Championship Espiritú de Montjuїc, F1 Academy
 June: Formula One Spanish Grand Prix, FIA Formula 2 Championship, FIA Formula 3 Championship
 July: FIM CEV Moto3 Junior World Championship, FIM CEV Moto2 European Championship, European Talent Cup, 24 Horas de Catalunya de Motociclismo
 September: Grand Prix motorcycle racing Catalan motorcycle Grand Prix, MotoE World Championship Catalunya eRace, 24H Series 24h de Barcelona Trofeu Fermí Vélez, Alpine Elf Europa Cup
 October: FIA ETCR – eTouring Car World Cup, GT World Challenge Europe, International GT Open, GT4 European Series, Euroformula Open Championship, TCR Europe Touring Car Series
 November: Renault Clio Cup Europe, Eurocup-3, F4 Spanish Championship, TCR Spain Campeonato de España de Superturismos, Campeonato de España de Superbike
 December: Campeonato de España de Resistencia

 Former

 Deutsche Tourenwagen Masters (2006–2009)
 EuroBOSS Series (2007)
 European Touring Car Championship (2003)
 European Truck Racing Championship (1996–1999, 2002, 2004–2009)
 Euroseries 3000 (2006–2008)
 FFSA GT Championship (2017–2018)
 FIA GT Championship (2003)
 FIA Sportscar Championship (1999–2002)
 FIA World Rallycross Championship World RX of Spain (2015–2022)
 Formula 3 Euro Series (2006–2009)
 Formula Renault Eurocup (2006–2013, 2017–2020)
 GP2 Series Catalunya GP2 round (2005–2016)
 GP3 Series (2010–2018)
 Grand Prix motorcycle racing European motorcycle Grand Prix (1992–1995)
 International Formula 3000 (1992, 1994–1995, 1998–2004)
 Porsche Supercup (1993–1995, 1999–2020)
 Sidecar World Championship (1994–1996)
 World Series Formula V8 3.5 (2002–2004, 2006–2013, 2016)
 W Series (2022)

Lap records

As of March 2023, the official fastest race lap records at the Circuit de Barcelona-Catalunya are listed as:

Financial problems 
The public attendance at the Spanish Grand Prix, and at the Catalan motorcycle Grand Prix, have fallen significantly since 2007, which has complicated the economic solvency of this circuit.

At least since 2009, the circuit is economically deficient, and in the period 2009–2018, €50.5m of losses were generated. The economic survival of the circuit is only guaranteed by large volumes of public money, which both the Provincial Deputation of Barcelona  and the Generalitat de Catalunya provide in the form of grants and rinsing of losses.

Given these poor results, some senior officials of the Generalitat de Catalunya have considered eliminating Formula One from this Circuit. Due to the irregularities detected in the last audit, the City Council of Barcelona decided to cancel the economic grant that the circuit received until now, which has aggravated its economic survival. Recently, some more irregularities have been detected, even by the Generalitat de Catalunya.

Noise pollution 
The circuit is located in an elevated area with respect to its environment, and without protective measures to minimize the noise pollution produced by cars, motorbikes and other vehicles. Therefore, it is a real source of acoustic disturbance, and the noise produced during many days of racing and testing during the year is noticeable for many kilometers around the circuit, especially in the adjacent municipalities, which is recognized by the Generalitat itself, the main owner of the Circuit.

References

External links

Official website
Circuit de Catalunya at Official Formula 1 website
Circuit de Barcelona-Catalunya on Google Maps (Current Formula 1 Tracks)

Buildings and structures completed in 1991
Venues of the 1992 Summer Olympics
Formula One circuits
Grand Prix motorcycle circuits
Motorsport venues in Catalonia
Spanish Grand Prix
Motorsport venues in Spain
Sports venues completed in 1991
World Rallycross circuits
Olympic cycling venues
1991 establishments in Spain
Montmeló